Berrien is a French surname. Notable people with the surname include:

 Frank Berrien (1877–1951), American football coach
 Jacqueline A. Berrien (1961–2015), American lawyer
 John Berrien (1711–1772), American judge
 John Berrien (major) (1759–1815), American military officer
 John M. Berrien (1781–1856), American senator
 Lucille Berrien (born 1928) American political activist

See also 
 

French-language surnames